Bristol House is a historic home located at Lima in Livingston County, New York. It was built between 1870 and 1875 and is a two-story, three bay wide by two bay deep, Italianate style frame dwelling.  The front facade is dominated by the elaborate canopy above the slightly recessed, paneled wooden doors of the side hall entrance.

It was listed on the National Register of Historic Places in 1989.

References

Houses on the National Register of Historic Places in New York (state)
Italianate architecture in New York (state)
Houses completed in 1875
Houses in Livingston County, New York
National Register of Historic Places in Livingston County, New York